The England cricket team toured Sri Lanka in October and November 2018 to play three Tests, five One Day Internationals (ODIs) and one Twenty20 International (T20I) match. The tour included England's first Test matches in Sri Lanka since 2012.

In September 2018, Sri Lanka Cricket named Dinesh Chandimal as the captain of the ODI team, replacing Angelo Mathews. Days later, Mathews was dropped from Sri Lanka's ODI side due to fitness concerns. However, Mathews was named in Sri Lanka's Test squad, which was named at the same time as the ODI squad. 

England won the ODI series 3–1, after the first match finished in a no result. Despite all five ODIs being affected by rain, the England and Wales Cricket Board (ECB) defended the decision to play the series during Sri Lanka's monsoon season, saying that they had "very little wriggle room" with regards to the dates. England won the one-off T20I match by 30 runs.

In October 2018, Sri Lankan bowler Rangana Herath announced that he would retire from international cricket following the first Test in Galle. In the first innings of the match, he became the third bowler to take 100 Test wickets at the same venue, when he dismissed the England captain Joe Root. After the match, Herath said that it was "the right time" to retire, finishing his career with 433 Test wickets, the most for a left-arm spin bowler. Sri Lanka's Test captain, Dinesh Chandimal, was ruled out of the rest of the series after suffering an injury in the first Test, with Suranga Lakmal named as his replacement as captain for the remaining two Tests.

England won the first two Test matches, therefore giving them an unassailable lead, and their first series win in Sri Lanka since 2001. England went on to win the third Test by 42 runs, therefore winning the series 3–0. It was the first time that England had won every Test of a three-match series in Sri Lanka. It was also England's first clean sweep in an overseas series of three or more Tests since beating New Zealand in 1963. The Test series saw 100 wickets taken by spin bowling, a record for a three-match series.

Squads

Liam Plunkett was included in the England ODI squad, but missed the first three matches due to his wedding. Prior to the third ODI, Liam Dawson was ruled out of the series with a side strain, and replaced by Joe Denly. Jonny Bairstow suffered an injury in training ahead of the fourth ODI and was ruled out of the remaining limited-over matches. Chris Jordan was added to the England squad for the one-off T20I. Ben Foakes was added to England's Test squad as cover for Jonny Bairstow. Bairstow's injury also ruled him out of the first Test. Ahead of the second Test, Ollie Pope was released from England's squad, to allow him to play with the England Lions.

Kusal Mendis was added to Sri Lanka's squad, replacing Kusal Perera who suffered an injury during the second ODI match. Kusal Perera was then ruled out of the one-off T20I, with Sadeera Samarawickrama added to Sri Lanka's squad for the match. Ahead of the Test series, Lahiru Kumara was removed from Sri Lanka's squad for disciplinary reasons, and was replaced by Dushmantha Chameera. Ahead of the second Test, Charith Asalanka was added to Sri Lanka's squad. For the third Test, Nishan Peiris replaced Akila Dananjaya in Sri Lanka's squad. Dananjaya was reported for a suspect bowling action during the first Test. Danushka Gunathilaka was added to Sri Lanka's squad for the third Test, with Asalanka being released.

Tour matches

1st 50 over match: Sri Lanka Board XI vs England

2nd 50 over match: Sri Lanka Board XI vs England

1st Two-day match: Sri Lanka Board XI vs England

2nd Two-day match: Sri Lanka Board XI vs England

ODI series

1st ODI

2nd ODI

3rd ODI

4th ODI

5th ODI

T20I match

Only T20I

Test series

1st Test

2nd Test

3rd Test

Notes

References

External links
 Series home at ESPN Cricinfo

2018 in English cricket
2018 in Sri Lankan cricket
International cricket competitions in 2018–19
English cricket tours of Sri Lanka